Chuck E. Cheese in the Galaxy 5000 is a 1999 direct-to-video film that was based upon Chuck E. Cheese's. It was released on October 5, 1999 in CEC restaurants. The plot is that a boy named Charlie Rockit needs $50,000 to fix his aunt and uncle's tractor engine, so Chuck E. Cheese and his friends go to the Galaxy 5000 to win it in a race.

Plot
Charlie Rockit's aunt and uncle are in danger of losing their farm because they need $50,000 to replace their broken tractor. To raise the money, Chuck E. Cheese, Jasper T. Jowls, Mr. Munch and Helen Henny decide to race in the Galaxy 5000 on the planet Orion (to which they travel via Pasqually's Awesome Adventure Machine).

They face many challenges, including a racing vehicle that is practically junk, a duo of cheating competitors known as the X-Pilots, and a woman named Astrid whom Chuck falls for but who's only interested in the prize money. Everything seems to go from bad to worse for Chuck, but just when he is at his lowest point, he meets a hermit named Harry who gets him to believe in himself and helps him train for the race.

During the race, Chuck overcomes the cheaters' maneuvers, getting stuck in a forest, and his own self-doubts to reach the finish line. After winning the prize, Chuck E. and his friends head home.

Cast

Live-action cast
  Galen Beyea as Charlie Rockit
  Stephen Lange as Pasqually, Harry the Hermit
  Don Shook as Flapjack
 Jon Rice, Chris Cason, Gary Frank and Mike Hawes as Reporters
  Chris Nash, Jerry Patin, Josh Cosimo and Gen Fukunaga as Policemen
 Chris Sabat as Piano Player
 The Morris Brothers as Soda Shop Stage Dancers
  Kenyon Holmes as Peter
 Rob Flanagan as Ivan
  Jackson Kane as Dr. Zoom
 Lydia Mackay as Astrid
  Johnathon Vought as Pizza Guy
  Candace Bordelon, Tim Conkey, Andrew DeLuma, Ron Cyphers, Josh Olkowski, Angie Guerrero, Terri Shaw, Alice Guidry, Samantha Sutherland, Jacquelyn Sutherland, Taylour Smith, Becky Taylor, Sonya Sui and Stevie Webb as Dancers

Voice cast
 Duncan Brannan as Chuck E. Cheese
  Georgia Denney as Helen Henny
  Jeremy Blaido as Jasper T. Jowls
 Chris Sabat as Mr. Munch, Announcer, Narrator

Suit performers
  Peyton Welch and Daphne Gere as Chuck E. Cheese
  Georgia Denney and Linda Coleman as Helen Henny
  Micah Menikos and Shay Coldwell as Jasper T. Jowls
 Chris Cason and Reny Fulton as Mr. Munch

Songs
"The Galaxy's For You and Me" . . . Duncan Brannan, Georgia Denney
"The Real Me" . . . Heather Garner
"Snowball's Chance in Texas" . . . Jeremy Blaido
"Zoom Gas" . . . Neil Bligh
"True Potential" . . . Michael McFarland
"I Know I Can" . . . Duncan Brannan, Jeremy Blaido, Chris Sabat, Georgia Denney, Michael McFarland
"We Did It" . . . Duncan Brannan, Georgia Denney, Jeremy Blaido, Chris Sabat
"A Little Help From Above" . . . Ashley Seekatz, Brett Cline

References

External links
 
 
 Chuck E. Cheese in the Galaxy 5000 at Toonarific.com

1999 films
1999 comedy films
1999 direct-to-video films
1990s children's comedy films
1990s adventure comedy films
American children's comedy films
American children's adventure films
Films about mice and rats
Films set on fictional planets
Funimation
1990s English-language films
1990s American films